Wild Horses is a 1985 American Western television film directed by Dick Lowry and starring Kenny Rogers and Pam Dawber. It originally premiered on CBS on November 12, 1985.

Cast
 Kenny Rogers as Matt Cooper
 Pam Dawber as Daryl Reese
 Ben Johnson as Bill Ward
 David Andrews as Dean Ellis
 Richard Masur as Bob Bowne
 Karen Carlson as Ann Cooper
 Richard Farnsworth as Chuck Reese

References
 Wild Horses at Turner Classic Movies
 Kenny Rogers: Wild Horses shoot at Rolling Stone

External links
 
 

1985 television films
1985 Western (genre) films
American Western (genre) television films
CBS network films
Films directed by Dick Lowry
Films scored by Hans Zimmer
Films set in Wyoming
Films shot in Wyoming
1980s English-language films